Six Minutes is a children's podcast by Gen-Z Media and Public Radio Exchange. The podcast consists of 204 episodes and 2 seasons. A spin-off of the show titled Six Minutes: Out of Time was released in early March 2023, with new episodes releasing every Tuesday and Thursday.

History 
Gen-Z Media was founded in 2016 by David Kreizman, Benjamin Strouse, and Chris Tarry. The company launched Six Minutes in March of 2018.

Premise 
The protagonist is a 12-year-old girl named Holiday who was found stranded in the ocean off the coast of Alaska by the Anders family.
Six Minutes: Out of Time is set three years after the finale of Six Minutes. The protagonist is Holiday's classmate and enemy named Brynleigh, who sets out to Florida to uncover the mystery about her missing mother.

Production 
The podcast was produced by Gen-Z Media in partnership with PRX. The podcast was later added to Wondery. The podcast was also translated into Spanish. Each episode is six minutes long.

Main cast and characters 

 Shahadi Wright Joseph as Holiday
 Zeph Maffei as Cyrus Anders
 Lily Brooks O'Briant as Birdie Anders
 Amy Hutchins as Monica Anders
 Michael Crane as James Anders
 Ryan Shanahan as Badger
 Isabella Denissen as Casey Dupres
 Ava DeMary as Brynleigh Pasternack
 Dennis Connors as Magnus
 Sam Oz Stone as Adam
 Isabella Ferreira as Cam
 Graham Stevens as Dr. Whittier
 Aaliyah Habeeb as Angelica Graves (also Delphine)
 Rob Bogue as Mr. Pasternack

Reception 
Wil Williams did not write in [[
 (website)|Polygon]] "

Adaption 
A deal has been made to create a three-book adaption of the podcast with Razorbill of Penguin Random House.

See also 
 The Alien Adventures of Finn Caspian
 The Unexplainable Disappearance of Mars Patel

References

External links 
  at Gen-Z Media
  at Wondery
  at PRX

2018 podcast debuts
Audio podcasts
Patreon creators
Scripted podcasts
Science fiction podcasts